The first season of American animated television series Regular Show, created by J. G. Quintel, originally aired on Cartoon Network in the United States. 
Quintel created the series' pilot using characters from his comedy shorts for the canceled anthology series The Cartoonstitute. He developed Regular Show from his own experiences in college. Simultaneously, several of the show's main characters originated from his animated shorts "2 in the AM PM" and "The Naïve Man from Lolliland." The season was produced by Cartoon Network Studios, and ran from September 6 to November 22, 2010.

Regular Show'''s first season was storyboarded and written by Quintel, Sean Szeles, Shion Takeuchi, Mike Roth, Jake Armstrong, Benton Connor, Kat Morris, Paul Scarlata, and Kent Osborne.

Development

Concept
Two 23-year-old friends, a blue jay named Mordecai and a raccoon named Rigby, are employed as groundskeepers at a park and spend their days trying to slack off and entertain themselves by any means. This is much to the chagrin of their boss Benson and their coworker Skips, but the delight of Pops. Their other coworkers, Muscle Man (an overweight green man) and Hi-Five Ghost (a ghost with a hand extending from the top of his head), serve as their rivals.

Production
Many of the characters are loosely based on those developed for Quintel's student films at California Institute of the Arts: The Naive Man From Lolliland and 2 in the AM PM. Quintel pitched Regular Show for Cartoon Network's Cartoonstitute project, in which the network allowed artists to create pilots with no notes to be optioned as a show possibly. After being green-lit, Quintel recruited several indie comic book artists to compose the show's staff, as their style matched close to what he desired for the series. The season was storyboarded and written by Quintel, Sean Szeles, Shion Takeuchi, Mike Roth, Jake Armstrong, Benton Connor, Kat Morris, Paul Scarlata, and Kent Osborne while being produced by Cartoon Network Studios.

Roth is the creative director and Janet Dimon is the producer.

The first season of Regular Show was produced with heavy use of double entendres and mild language. Quintel stated that, although the network wanted to step up from the more child-oriented fare, some restrictions came along with this switch.

The whole season aired in the same timeslot on Mondays at 8:15 p.m., on Cartoon Network.

Cast

The voice actors include Quintel (as Mordecai) and William Salyers (as Rigby). Quintel states that the writing crew tries to "come up with dialogue that sounds conversational and not too cartoony so that the characters are more relatable." In addition, Sam Marin voices Pops, Benson, and Muscle Man, Mark Hamill voices Skips, a yeti, and Jeff Bennett voices Hi-Five Ghost in this season only; starting with season 2 to 8, Quintel takes over the role.

The character of Mordecai embodies Quintel during his college years, specifically at CalArts: "That's that time when you're hanging out with your friends and getting into stupid situations, but you're also taking it seriously enough." The character of Rigby developed randomly when Quintel drew a raccoon hula-hooping on a Post-It. He liked the design and developed the character of Rigby to be a jerk character who is far more irresponsible than his companion.

Reception
The season generally received positive reviews from most critics, gaining a Metascore—a weighted average based on the impression of critical reviews—of 76 percent. Critics enjoyed the risque and adult innuendos and humor, the animation style, and the voice acting.

Episodes

Home media
Warner Home Video released multiple DVDs, consisting of region 1 formats. Slack Pack, Party Pack, Fright Pack, Mordecai & Margaret Pack and Rigby Pack were created for Region 1 markets containing episodes from the first season.

Full season releaseThe Complete First & Second Seasons'' was released on Blu-ray and DVD on July 16. 2013.

References

2010 American television seasons
Regular Show seasons